This article is a catalog of actresses and models who have appeared on the cover of Harper's Bazaar Japan, the Japanese edition of Harper's Bazaar magazine, starting with the magazine's first issue in March 2014.

2014

2015

2016

2017

2018

2019

2020

External links
 Harper's Bazaar Japan
 Harper's Bazaar Japan on Models.com
 

Japan